New Florence is the name of several towns in the United States:

New Florence, Missouri
New Florence, Pennsylvania

See also